Willersey is a village in Gloucestershire, South West England, situated close to the boundary with Worcestershire, West Midlands region and southwest of Evesham. Although situated in Gloucestershire, the postal county for the village is Worcestershire, due to it being covered by the Broadway post town. It is an old village with much character. There are two pubs in the village - The Bell Inn and The New Inn. There is a primary school and as well as a large park area. The duck pond is much admired by visitors to the village.

Pubs
The Bell Inn is a 17th-century Cotswold stone Building. Its sign is a depiction of a large bell and the pub actual has a wooden bell tower to the right as you look at it.

The New Inn was located toward the top of main street near the village shop, but unfortunately, it has shut.

Transport 
Willersey is known for being the home of YOG.
Between 1904 and 1960, Willersey was served by a halt on the Honeybourne Line.

Today Willersey is served by three bus routes each operated by a different bus company. Willersey to Evesham, known as Rural 4 is operated by N.N. Cresswell Coach Hire Ltd. Prior to Autumn 2013 the Willersey to Evesham was operated by Castleways Coaches. The Willersey to Cheltenham route is operated by Castleways Coaches. The third route is Moreton-in-Marsh to Stratford-upon-Avon which is operated by Johnsons buses.

The nearest railway station to Willersey is Honeybourne which is served by the Cotswold line, offering a direct journey to London Paddington. However Honeybourne station is unreachable by public transport so travellers can go by bus to Moreton-in-Marsh or Evesham to catch a train on the same line.

Taylor's garage in Willersey sells fuel and offers motor repairs. Mr Taylor, the garage owner, has a collection of classic cars which are on show at various times of the year in the garage and also during special events within the village. The next event is the Willersey Horticultural and Craft Show on 26 August, Bank Holiday Monday.

Industry
Unlike many Cotswold villages, Willersey is not a tourist magnet. Despite its beauty and typical village charm Willersey remains unspoilt by rows of tourist shops. Instead Willersey is an industrial and farming village. The village has its own industrial estate with many businesses and is home to Auto-Sleepers a motorhome manufacturer and Vale Press a printing company.

Church

The Church of St Peter was built in the 12th century. It is a grade I listed building.

References

External links

 Comprehensive guide to Willersey Village in the Cotswolds, UK.

Villages in Gloucestershire